Xiong Kang, also called Xiong Wukang, was the seventh viscount of the state of Chu during the early Zhou Dynasty (1046–256 BC) of ancient China.  Like other early Chu rulers, he held the hereditary noble rank of viscount first granted to his ancestor Xiong Yi by King Cheng of Zhou.

Xiong Kang succeeded his father Xiong Qu.  The Records of the Grand Historian (Shiji) says that Xiong Kang died early and Xiong Qu was succeeded by Xiong Zhi, but the recently discovered Tsinghua Bamboo Slips recorded Xiong Kang as the successor of Xiong Qu.

References

Monarchs of Chu (state)
Year of birth unknown
Year of death unknown